Rancho Grande is a municipality in Matagalpa, Nicaragua.

Rancho Grande may also refer to:

 Rancho Grande, New Mexico, a census-designated place in Catron County
 Rancho Grande (film), a 1940 Western film directed by Frank McDonald
 Rancho Grande (Mexibús), a bus rapid transit station in Nezahualcóyotl, Mexico
 Rancho Grande Airstrip, in Ensenada, Baja California, Mexico
 Rancho Grande River, in Santa Catarina, Brazil